The minister of mental health and addictions is a minister of the Crown and a member of the Canadian Cabinet. The office is associated with the Department of Health.

Dr. Carolyn Bennett is the first and current minister of mental health and addictions. She was appointed on October 26, 2021 and concurrently serves as the associate minister of health.

List of ministers

References 

Mental Health and Addictions
Mental health in Canada